Agustín Doffo (born 25 May 1995) is an Argentine professional footballer who plays as a midfielder for Slovenian PrvaLiga club Olimpija Ljubljana.

Club career
Born in Oliva, Córdoba, Doffo joined Vélez Sarsfield's youth setup in 2010. He made his first team debut on 23 May 2016, coming on as a late substitute for fellow youth graduate Nicolás Delgadillo in a 3–1 away win against Banfield in the Primera División championship; he also provided an assist for Mariano Pavone's last goal.

In August 2016 Doffo moved to Villarreal, signing a one-year loan deal and being assigned to the reserves in Segunda División B.

On 29 May 2022, he signed a two-year deal with Slovenian PrvaLiga side Olimpija Ljubljana.

References

External links

1995 births
Living people
Sportspeople from Córdoba Province, Argentina
Argentine footballers
Argentine expatriate footballers
Association football midfielders
Association football wingers
Club Atlético Vélez Sarsfield footballers
Villarreal CF B players
Associação Chapecoense de Futebol players
O'Higgins F.C. footballers
FK Tuzla City players
NK Olimpija Ljubljana (2005) players
Argentine Primera División players
Segunda División B players
Campeonato Brasileiro Série A players
Chilean Primera División players
Premier League of Bosnia and Herzegovina players
Slovenian PrvaLiga players
Argentine expatriate sportspeople in Spain
Argentine expatriate sportspeople in Brazil
Argentine expatriate sportspeople in Chile
Argentine expatriate sportspeople in Bosnia and Herzegovina
Argentine expatriate sportspeople in Slovenia
Expatriate footballers in Spain
Expatriate footballers in Brazil
Expatriate footballers in Chile
Expatriate footballers in Bosnia and Herzegovina
Expatriate footballers in Slovenia